Bilston was a parliamentary constituency centred on the town of Bilston in what is now the southeast of the city of Wolverhampton in the West Midlands.  It returned one Member of Parliament (MP)  to the House of Commons of the Parliament of the United Kingdom.

As well as the town of Bilston, which had been heavily industrialised town since the 19th century, it also incorporated the nearby communities of Sedgley and Coseley, both of which were still predominantly rural villages when the parliamentary seat was created in 1918, but by the time the constituency changed from Wolverhampton Bilston to Bilston 32 years later they were rapidly expanding into towns, and had expanded further still when the constituency was finally abolished in 1974.

History
The area was created, as a Staffordshire borough constituency, for the 1918 general election. It was named as a division of Wolverhampton. From the 1950 general election the Wolverhampton prefix was dropped from the official constituency name. The seat was abolished for the February 1974 general election, when it was largely replaced by the new Wolverhampton South East constituency.

Boundaries 
1918–1950: The constituency consisted of the then Urban Districts of Bilston, Coseley and Sedgley.

1950–1974: By 1950 Bilston was a Municipal Borough. Coseley and Sedgley were still Urban Districts in the constituency. In 1966 most of Sedgley was incorporated into an expanded borough of Dudley, which also took in the south of Coseley, while the remainder of Sedgley was transferred to Wolverhampton and Seisdon and sections of Coseley were transferred to Wolverhampton and West Bromwich.

Members of Parliament

Election results

Elections in the 1910s

Elections in the 1920s

Elections in the 1930s

Elections in the 1940s

Elections in the 1950s

Elections in the 1960s

Elections in the 1970s

See also 
 List of Members of Parliament for Wolverhampton
 List of parliamentary constituencies in Wolverhampton

References 

 Boundaries of Parliamentary Constituencies 1885-1972, compiled and edited by F.W.S. Craig (Parliamentary Reference Publications 1972)

Parliamentary constituencies in Wolverhampton
Parliamentary constituencies in Staffordshire (historic)
Parliamentary constituencies in the West Midlands (county) (historic)
Constituencies of the Parliament of the United Kingdom established in 1918
Constituencies of the Parliament of the United Kingdom disestablished in 1974